Good Egg(s) or The Good Eggs(s) may refer to

 The Good Egg, a 2019 children's book by Jory John
 "The Good Egg", a 1939 episode of Looney Tunes